An atom is a basic unit of matter consisting of a nucleus within a cloud of one or more electrons.

Atom(s) may also refer to:

Mathematics
 Atom (time), a medieval unit of time
 Atom (measure theory), a minimal measurable set
 Atom (order theory)
 Atomic formula, a single predicate in first-order logic
 Atom, a urelement in set theory

Computing

Hardware
 Intel Atom, a line of microprocessors
 Atom (system on chip), an Intel system on chip platform for smartphones and tablets
 Acorn Atom, an early 1980s home computer

Software 
 Atom (standard), an XML-based web syndication format
 Atom (programming language), a programming language for real-time embedded software
 Atom (text editor), a programming text editor developed by GitHub
 Atoms, a fundamental scalar data type in the Lisp programming language, see Lisp (programming language)#Atoms
 A synonym for symbol in some programming languages

Transport
 Ariel Atom, a high performance sports car
 Aston Martin Atom, a 1939 prototype car
 ATOM (IFV), an infantry fighting vehicle jointly developed by Russia and France
 Ozone Atom, a French paraglider design

Literature
Atom (Asimov book), 1991 nonfiction book by Isaac Asimov
Atom (Krauss book), 2001 nonfiction book by Lawrence M. Krauss
 Atom (character), several fictional comic book superheroes from the DC Comics universe
Atom: The Beginning, Japanese manga series
 Captain Atom, a Charlton Comics superhero
 Atom, the narrator of The History and Adventures of an Atom satire by Tobias Smollett

Music
 Atom™, an alias of the German musician Uwe Schmidt (born 1968)
 Atom, an album by Moonbeam
 A.T.O.M (album), an album by Carbon/Silicon
 "Atom", a song by British Sea Power
 "Atom," a song by Cannibal Ox from The Cold Vein
Atomi, a Yugoslav rock band

People
 Atom (martyr), a Christian martyr
 Arthur Thomson (fanzines) or ATom (1927–1990), British science fiction artist and writer
 Atom Araullo, a Filipino broadcast journalist
 Atom Egoyan, a Canadian stage and film director, writer and producer
 Maxwell Atoms (born 1974), American animator

Sports teams 
 Philadelphia Atoms, American soccer team (1973–1976)
 Philadelphia Atoms SC, American soccer team (founded 2017)
 Jersey City Atoms , a former American basketball team
 Tri-City Atoms, various American minor league baseball teams from Washington
 Pohang Atoms, a former name of the Pohang Steelers, Korean association football team
 Atoms, the sports teams of Annandale High School in Virginia

Film and television
 A.T.O.M. (TV series), a toy line or its associated animated series
 Atom.com, a former on-line video producer, formerly AtomFilms
 Atom TV, a television series featuring content from Atom.com
 Springfield Atoms, the fictional football team from Springfield in The Simpsons
The Atom (1918 film), a 1918 silent film directed by Frank Borzage

Other uses
 Atom (video game), a 1983 educational game for the TRS-80
 Atom Bank, a digital finance company
 Ancient Teachings of the Masters, a new religious movement
 The Atom (sculpture), in Pendle, Lancashire, England
 A British publisher owned by Little, Brown Book Group
 An object lacking proper parts; see 
 Atoms (brand), a footwear brand

See also
 Atom and His Package, a band whose sole human member is Adam Goren
 Atomic (disambiguation)
 Atomicity (disambiguation)
 Atomism, philosophy about the basic building blocks of reality
 Nuclear (disambiguation)
 Atum, an ancient Egyptian deity
 Adam (disambiguation)